Maria Kliegel (born 14 November 1952) is a German cellist.

Professional career
Kliegel was born in Dillenburg, Hesse. She studied under Janos Starker starting at the age of 19.  She won first prize at the American College Competition, First German Music Competition and Concours Aldo Parisot, and was also the Grand Prize winner at the second Mstislav Rostropovich International Cello Competition in 1981.

Russian composer Alfred Schnittke recognized her interpretation as the standard recording of his work when she recorded his First Concerto for Cello and Orchestra in 1990. On top of this, she has done many recordings for Naxos, including concertos and other cello works by Beethoven, Bloch, Brahms, Bruch, Dohnányi, Dvořák, Elgar, Lalo, Saint-Saëns, Shostakovich, Schumann, Tavener and Tchaikovsky. She has also recorded a large volume of chamber music by Brahms, Chopin, Demus, Gubaidulina, Kodály, Mendelssohn and Schubert. She will soon be recording Beethoven's complete works for cello and piano, Haydn's cello concertos and Bach's solo cello suites.

She formerly played a Stradivarius, which has become known as the ex-Gendron, for the famous French cellist Maurice Gendron. Currently, she performs on a cello made by Carlo Tononi in Venice c. 1730.

Since 1986 she has taught a master class at the Hochschule für Musik Köln.

Selected recordings

 Camille Saint-Saëns, Cello concerto n°1 & n°2, Suite op.16, The Swan, Allegro Appassionato op.43, Bournemouth Sinfonietta, conductor Jean-François Monnard. CD Naxos 1995

References

External links 
Maria Kliegel biography and discography at Naxos

1952 births
Living people
People from Dillenburg
German classical cellists
German women classical cellists